Professional Systems Associates, Inc. (PSA) is a small, veteran-owned business, located in Panama City, Florida. PSA is a Florida Corporation and was incorporated on October 20, 1988.  PSA's growth is rooted in: the partnership with General Services Administration and the GSA Schedule 70 IT contract, a very low employee turnover rate and the PSA Management team, which has been together since 1989.

PSA develops and maintains CMPRO, an enterprise-class commercial off-the-shelf product lifecycle management and configuration management web-based software designed for the aerospace and defense industries. CMPRO is the first Product Lifecycle Management (PLM) tool to get a five star rating from Institute of Configuration Management (CMII).

History with the United States Department of Defense and Government 

PSA has extensive experience supporting projects for the United States Navy and other United States Department of Defense agencies and contractors. PSA has been approved by the General Services Administration, has established a relationship with the Small Business Administration, and was awarded a contract with  SeaPort-e.

PSA added its first Government client, the Diving & Salvage Branch at the Naval Coastal Systems Center in Panama City, Florida in January 1989.  Soon after beginning work on the Diving & Salvage contract PSA was successful in establishing a sub-contracting agreement with several prime contractors who were working in the Panama City, Florida area. With the subcontracting relationships in place, PSA added its second Government customer, the Special Warfare Support Branch at Naval Coastal Systems Center in Panama City, Florida. Both of these organizations are still being supported by PSA almost two decades later.

In January 1998, PSA's CMPRO software product and services support was added to DLT Solutions GSA Schedule 70 IT contract.  Two years later in 2000, PSA submitted a proposal for a GSA Schedule 70, IT contract.  GSA awarded PSA contract GS-35F-0473S on September 25, 2000.  Under the GSA contract, PSA has contracted for over $7 Million with numerous Government agencies.

In April 2006, PSA was audited by the Small Business Administration, on behalf of the General Services Administration for a follow on, $8 Million GSA Schedule 70, IT contract. SBA completed its audit of PSA's finances, facilities and ability to perform successfully on the GSA contract, and on April 21, 2006 issued PSA a Certificate of Competency which confirmed PSA's ability to perform on the contract, SBA Case Number COC-04-22596.  On June 19, 2006 GSA awarded PSA its second, five year, Schedule 70, IT contract.

In addition to having been approved by the GSA, PSA is one of the Prime vendors on SeaPort-e, a vehicle for U.S. Navy customers. SeaPort-e is a Multiple Award Contract (MAC) that is designed to include all aspects of professional support services and Engineering, Technical, & Programmatic Support Services as required by the Virtual Systems Command, its related Program Executive Offices (PEOs), and field affiliates. PSA's scope on SeaPort-e includes:

Configuration Management Support
Program Support
Software Engineering, Development, Programming, and Network Support
System Design Documentation and Technical Data Support

References 

Product lifecycle management
Configuration management
Document management systems
Software companies established in 1988
Companies based in Florida